Brent Muscat (born April 23, 1967) is an American musician best known as the guitarist of glam metal band Faster Pussycat.

Faster PussyCat, etc. 
Faster Pussycat was formed in the 1980s Hollywood glam metal boom. The original line up consisted of Brent, along with Taime Downe and Greg Steele. The band's most successful album Wake Me When It's Over earned "Gold" status from the RIAA.

The name of the band is derived from the Russ Meyer film Faster, Pussycat! Kill! Kill!. Brent left the band in 1993.

On April 21, 2007, Muscat circulated via MySpace an open invitation to Taime Downe and Greg Steele to reunite the classic Faster Pussycat lineup with him (Downe had been touring in a new incarnation of the group, featuring only himself from the original lineup).

Brent's version of Faster Pussycat toured Europe in Spring 2007 with Kurt Frohlich replacing Taime on vocals along with Todd Kerns on guitar.

After a short name dispute with Taime Downe, Brent dropped his claim and dissolved his incarnation of the band.

Deluxe 
Brent formed Deluxe back in 1994 with Marc Anthony vocals, Tommy T-bone Caradonna (ex-White Lion, Alice Cooper, Lita Ford) on bass and Gary Kaluza (ex-Glory Chain) on guitar.

Sin City Sinners 
Muscat currently lives in Las Vegas and co-owns the band Sin City Sinners.
with Todd Kerns (Age of Electric, Static in Stereo, Slash featuring Myles Kennedy and the Conspirators, Kulick). The band is rounded out with Rob Cournoyer (ex-Raging Slab), and Michael "Doc" Ellis (RaTT). (With guest appearance from musician/actor Zachary Throne.) Sin City Sinners has been called the hardest working band in Las Vegas.

ALLEY CATS LV, The Saints of Las Vegas, Original Sin LV, etc. 
Muscat is one of the characters in the book Sex Tips from Rock Stars by Paul Miles, published by Omnibus Press in July 2010.

ALLEY CATS LV 
Muscat, Executive Producer Shion Francois, and Takashi O'hashi who is a Japanese guitarist (Cats In Boots, SEIKIMAII II, The Outsiders) formed ALLEY CATS LV from 2016. Also the member of this band are Zachary Throne on vocal and bass and drummer Stephen Mills.

In early 2017 they released their first self titled Ep, which was followed up by a tour in Japan.  After the tour the band returned to the studio to record its second EP with the single Speed Racing Superstar.

In December 2017 Brent took a "hiatus" from Alley Cats.

The Saints of Las Vegas 
Brent also formed the band Saints of Las Vegas, with Anthony Serrano as the lead singer. On February 7, 2018, the Saints released the single “TOMEKA”. They followed that up on March 15, 2018 with the single and lyric music video for "Panic Room".

Original Sin LV 
In 2017 Brent joined Todd Kerns along with the most well known line up of the Sin City Sinners in a limited number of shows.  They followed up this limited engagement with an August 31, 2018, gig at the world-famous Count's Vamp'd RockBar & Grill.

Radio Show 
Brent Muscat hosted his own radio show "Mondays with Muscat" on lvrockradio that featured local music and musicians.

He also co-hosted "Sinful Sundays" with Dirk Vermin on radiovegas.rocks

Discography
Faster Pussycat
 Faster Pussycat (1987)
 Wake Me When It's Over (1989)
 Live and Rare (1990)
 Whipped! (1992)

Phil Lewis
 More Purple Than Black (1999)

Liberators
 Access Denied (2000)

Bubble
 How Bout This (2000)
Various Artists - 11th Street Tales: A Tribute to Hanoi Rocks (2000)

L.A. Guns 
 Rips the Covers Off (2004)

Underground Rebels
 Insult to Injury (2007)

Sin City Sinners
 Exile on Fremont Street (2010)
 Broken Record (2010)
 A Sinners Christmas (2011)

ALLEY CATS LV
 ALLEY CATS LV (2016)
 Speed Racing Superstar (2017)

The Saints Of Las Vegas
 Tomeka, Single (Jan. 2018)
 Panic Room, Single (Feb. 2018)
 Rock n Roll Groupie, Single (March. 2018)

Charity work 
On February 19, 2012, Brent announced live on Las Vegas Radio station Komp 92.3 that on March 16 he will have his head shaved in front of a live audience to stand in solidarity with kids fighting cancer, but more importantly, to raise money to find cures through the St Baldrick's charity.
On March 16, 2012 Brent shaved his head on stage in front of a sold out crowd and beat his goal raising thousands of dollars for the St. Baldrick's foundation.

Awards
In 1989, Brent received a gold record award for Faster Pussycat's second album Wake Me When It's Over.  Years later, in 2004, he would earn his second gold record with the band's self-titled debut album, Faster Pussycat.

Sin City Sinners won "Best of Vegas" two years in a row (2009 and 2010) in the Las Vegas Review Journal reader's poll, and their music video 'Going to Vegas' received the 32nd annual Telly award. Brent and the Sin City Sinners as well as being the house band, won the Publisher's Pick award at the 2010 VRMA Awards.

References

External links 
Blogs N' Roses (blogsnroses.com) interview with Brent
Brent's official Metal Sludge Extravaganza Tour Diary (archived)
Brent and Faster Pussycat in C.C. Banana's own Metal Sludge Extravaganza Tour Diary
ALLEY CATS LV facebook
Brent Muscat official page

1967 births
20th-century American guitarists
20th-century American male musicians
Adler's Appetite members
American heavy metal guitarists
American male guitarists
Faster Pussycat members
L.A. Guns members
Liberators (American band) members
Living people
People from Hollywood, Los Angeles
Sin City Sinners members